Geoffrey Ball may refer to:

 Geoffrey Vernon Ball (1926–2015), British professor of ophthalmics
 Geoffrey R. Ball (born 1964), American physiologist and inventor